The Elektra Years 1978–1987 is a boxed set containing the six albums released by the new wave rock band The Cars during that time period. Each album was newly remastered by Ted Jensen, under the supervision of Ric Ocasek.  It was released in 2016 on Elektra Records on CD, digital and vinyl formats.

Albums
 The Cars (1978)
 Candy-O (1979)
 Panorama (1980)
 Shake It Up (1981)
 Heartbeat City (1984)
 Door to Door (1987)

Notes
The CD packaging replicates the original vinyl releases with the original vinyl inner sleeves serving as inserts for the CD slipcases. 
Heartbeat City in this box set is now released with white color borders instead of the original maroon, this change in color is what the band intended for the original release.

References

2016 compilation albums
The Cars compilation albums
Albums produced by Mike Shipley
Albums produced by Robert John "Mutt" Lange
Albums produced by Roy Thomas Baker
Elektra Records compilation albums